Benedetto Vigna (born 10 April 1969 in Potenza) is an Italian physicist and businessman. He is currently the chief executive officer of Ferrari.

Career
Born in Potenza, Basilicata, he grew up in the neighboring municipality of Pietrapertosa.

Graduating as a physicist from the University of Pisa in 1993, in 1995 he started working for STMicroelectronics starting the company's commitment to microelectromechanical systems.

He is the inventor of a three-dimensional motion sensor which was initially applied to the airbags of automobiles. After reducing its size and cost, the sensor was used in the Nintendo Wii console's wireless controller. For this invention, Vigna was included in the shortlist of twelve candidates for the "European Inventor 2010" award promoted by European Patent Organization. In his career he has registered more than one hundred patents.

On 9 June 2021, he was announced as the new chief executive officer of Ferrari.

References

Ferrari people
Formula One people
Living people
People from Potenza
1969 births
Italian physicists
Italian motorsport people